Jenners was a former well-established department store in Edinburgh, Scotland, situated on Princes Street. It was Scotland's oldest independent department store until the retail business was acquired by House of Fraser in 2005. It closed in December 2020 and was vacated by House of Fraser in May 2021. The building will eventually be restored.

History 

Jenners was founded as "Kennington & Jenner" in 1838 by Charles Jenner FRSE (1810–1893), a linen draper, and Charles Kennington. The store has never left its site on Princes Street, but its original building was destroyed by fire in 1892. In 1893 the Scottish architect William Hamilton Beattie was appointed to design a replacement, which subsequently opened in 1895. At Charles Jenner's insistence the building's facade was decorated with rows of female caryatids "to show symbolically that women are the support of the house". The new store featured many technical innovations such as electric lighting and hydraulic lifts, and is now a category A listed building.

Jenners was run for many years by the Douglas-Miller family, descendants of James Kennedy, who took charge of the store after Charles Jenner retired in 1881. Known as the "Harrods of the North", it has held a Royal Warrant since 1911, and was visited by Queen Elizabeth II on the occasion of its 150th anniversary in 1988.

Sale to House of Fraser 

On 16 March 2005 it was announced that the Douglas-Miller family were in advanced negotiations to sell the business to the House of Fraser, at an estimated price of £100–200 million, but a month later it was sold for £46.1 million. While other acquisitions by House of Fraser had been renamed, Jenners kept its identity.
The store made national news in 2007 when it publicly announced that it would stop selling paté de foie gras, following a boycott by the Duke and Duchess of Hamilton. In 2008, House of Fraser invested £3 million in improvements to the store. As a result of this, in 2016 the basement toy department was rebranded under the Hamleys name, before being closed in 2019.

The lease of the building remained with the Jenners holding company JPSE Ltd, owned by the Douglas-Miller family. In August 2005 it was sold to Moorcroft Capital Management, owned by Jenners' former chief executive Robbie Douglas-Miller. In 2017 the building was bought by Danish billionaire fashion retailer and landowner in Scotland Anders Holch Povlsen, reportedly for £53 million.

In late 2019 it was reported that the business was considering reducing its size or moving from Princes Street.

Department store closure 
In January 2021, it was announced that Jenners was closing and 200 jobs would be lost.  The Jenners signage was removed from the Princes Street building on 14 April 2021, reportedly to the surprise of the owners of the building.  Edinburgh City Council issued a Listed Building enforcement notice on 21 April 2021 to Sports Direct Retail, the Mike Ashley company that owns the Frasers Group, to reinstate the Jenners letters on the eastern and southern sides of the department store, as these had been removed without listed building consent. In May 2021, it was announced that the restoration of the building will take four years, and that the store was planned to reopen without the House of Fraser livery once redevelopment had completed.

Proposed hotel conversion 
In June 2022, AAA United, the company owned by Anders Holch Povlsen, was granted planning permission to convert the building to a 96-room hotel. Under the plans, the three-storey central atrium would be retained, as would the Jenners signage. The hotel rooms would occupy the upper floors, with new retail use, restaurants and cafés at the lower levels, and a new roof-top bar.

2023 fire

On 23 January 2023, a fire broke out at the rear of the empty building. A firefighter, Barry Martin, 38 was killed and 4 others injured, eyewitnesses described smoke pouring out of the basement area of the department store.

Stores
Jenners had two shops in 2020:
Princes Street, Edinburgh
Loch Lomond Shores

The Jenners store in the Loch Lomond Shores outlet in Balloch remains in operation. However is now marked as a dual Frasers and Sports Direct store, all branding from Jenners is practically absent.

Jenners previously had stores at Edinburgh Airport and Glasgow International Airport that closed following a decision announced in April 2007. Jenners said that security measures introduced in UK airports following the 2006 transatlantic aircraft plot had led to a significant downturn in trade at the shops.

See also
 Queen Victoria Building
 Harrods
 Forsyth's

References

External links

Official website

Department stores of the United Kingdom
Companies based in Edinburgh
House of Fraser
Service companies of Scotland
Retail companies established in 1838
British Royal Warrant holders
Scottish brands
Category A listed buildings in Edinburgh
New Town, Edinburgh
1838 establishments in Scotland
Department store buildings in the United Kingdom
Sports Direct